Daisuke Murakami may refer to:
 Daisuke Murakami (figure skater) (born 1991)
 Daisuke Murakami (snowboarder) (born 1983)